These are the songs that reached number one on the Top 100 Best Sellers chart in 1962 as published by Cash Box magazine.

See also
1962 in music
List of Hot 100 number-one singles of 1962 (U.S.)

References
http://www.cashboxmagazine.com/archives/60s_files/1962.html

1962
1962 record charts
1962 in American music